Patrick Donahoe (1811–1901) was an Irish-American publisher.

Patrick Donahoe may also refer to:

Patrick R. Donahoe (born 1955), 73rd United States Postmaster General
Patrick A. Donahoe (1816–1897), 24th President of Santa Clara University
Patrick J. Donahoe, US Army general